Nordwestradio was a German, public radio station owned and operated by the Radio Bremen (RB).

References

Radio Bremen
Defunct radio stations in Germany
Radio stations established in 2001
Radio stations disestablished in 2017
2001 establishments in Germany
2017 disestablishments in Germany
Mass media in Bremen (city)